Hinzmann is a German surname. Notable people with the surname include:

Gabriele Hinzmann (born 1947), East German athlete
Marcy Hinzmann (born 1982), American figure skater

See also
Heinzmann

German-language surnames